The 2005 FIU Golden Panthers football team represented Florida International University in the 2005 NCAA Division I-A football season as a member of the Sun Belt Conference (SBC). The Panthers were led by head coach Don Strock in his fourth season and finished with a record of five wins and six losses. However, in 2008, the NCAA Division I Committee on Infractions found major violations within the football program and as such vacated all of the Panthers' five wins from the 2005 season, changing their official record to 0–6.

Schedule

References

FIU
FIU Panthers football seasons
College football winless seasons
FIU Golden Panthers football